Olivier Cugnon de Sévricourt (born 12 June 1973) is a French former Paralympic judoka who competed at international judo competitions. He competed at three Paralympic Games and won a bronze medal at the 2008 Summer Paralympics, he is also a World silver medalist and a European silver medalist.

Cugnon de Sévricourt was an able bodied judoka who trained with Laurent Crost, Crost went on to compete at the 1996 Olympic Games. Olivier lost his eyesight in both eyes after he was involved in a road accident when he was aged twenty years old. He took a four-year break after the accident then returned to judo in 2001 while studying physiotherapy.

References

1973 births
Living people
People from Bourg-la-Reine
Paralympic judoka of France
French male judoka
Judoka at the 2004 Summer Paralympics
Judoka at the 2008 Summer Paralympics
Judoka at the 2012 Summer Paralympics
Medalists at the 2008 Summer Paralympics
Paralympic silver medalists for France
Paralympic medalists in judo
Sportspeople from Hauts-de-Seine
21st-century French people